Sinnerud is a village in Stange Municipality in Innlandet county, Norway. The European route E6 highway runs along the west side of the village.

Sinnerud the is considered to be part of the town of Hamar which stretches over the municipal border into Stange Municipality.

References

 

Stange
Villages in Innlandet